The Mitsubishi Fuso Aero Bus (kana:三菱ふそう・エアロバス) is a series of heavy-duty intercity coaches produced by the Japanese manufacturer Mitsubishi Fuso.
The range was primarily unavailable with left-hand drive. However, Turkish bus maker Temsa used produce a left hand drive variant of this model, called Mitsubishi Maraton. Its principal Japanese competitors are Isuzu Gala, Nissan Diesel Space Arrow and Hino S'elega.

Fuso tourist buses (predecessors of Aero Bus) 
MAR820 (1962)
B806､B905/906/907 (1967)
MS512/513 (1976, 1977)
K-MS613/615 (1980)

Aero Bus/Aero Queen

Aero Bus/Super Aero (MS) 
P-MS713/715/725 (1982)
U-MS716/726/729 (1984)

Aero Queen W (MU) 
Chassies based on the Aero King double-decker, 8DC9T engine equipped ("T"=turbocharged, maximum output: 380PS).
P-MU525TA (1985)
U-MU525TA (1990)

Aero Queen M/MV (MS) 
8DC11 Engine equipped.
P-MS729S (1988)
U-MS729S (1990)
P-MS725(1986)

New Aero Bus/New Aero Queen 
U-MS821/826/815 (1992)
8M20 Engine equipped, and wheelbase reduced to 6.15 meter.
Jake brake equipped (named "Powertard", except low-end model)
KC-MS822/829/815 (1995)
8M21 Engine equipped.
Front bumper design changed (Aero Bus and Queen-I).
KL-MS86/85 (2000)
All model equipped wedge air-brake and driver's airbag.
HID headlight equipped.
PJ-MS86 (2005)
Engine changed to 6M70 (turbocharged), and wheelbase reduced to 6.0 meter.
Queen-III deleted from line-up.
Tail light design changed (minor).

Aero Ace/Aero Queen 
These models are equipped Urea selective catalytic reduction system. (AdBlue needed)
BKG-MS96JP (2007)
6M70 Engine equipped
LKG-MS96VP (2010)
6R10 Engine equipped (Developed by MFTBC and Daimler), Wheelbases extended 95mm
QRG-/QTG-MS96VP (2012)
6R10 Engine equipped
Brake override system and side view cameras equipped
2TG-MS06GP (2018)
6S10 Engine equipped
"ShiftPlot"
Active Attention Assist, Active Brake Assist 3, and Proximity Control Assist equipped

Model lineup 
Aero Ace 12m (Hi-decker)
Aero Queen 12m (Super hi-decker)

Logistical lineup 
Hi-decker
Aero Queen I:12m
Aero Queen II:12m
Aero Queen III:12m
Super hi-decker
Aero Bus MS EX:12m
Aero Bus MS SA:12m
Aero Bus MS SX:12m
Aero Bus MS SD:12m
Aero Bus MS EX:11m
Aero Bus MS SX:11m
Aero Bus MS SD:11m
Aero Bus MM EX:9m
Aero Bus MM SD:9m

See also 

Mitsubishi Fuso Truck & Bus Corporation
Mitsubishi Fuso Aero King - Double-decker coach
 List of buses

External links 

Mitsubishi Fuso Aero Queen/Aero Ace(Japanese)

Aero Bus
Bus chassis
Buses of Japan
Coaches (bus)
Single-deck buses
Full-size buses
Vehicles introduced in 1982